The 2013–14 Cuban National Series was the 53rd season of the league. Pinar del Río defeated Matanzas in the series' final round.

References

Cuban National Series seasons
Cuban National Series
Cuban National Series
2013 in Cuban sport